Koninklijke Sint-Truidense Voetbalvereniging, commonly known as Sint-Truiden or STVV or by their nickname De Kanaries (is a Belgian professional football club located in the city of Sint-Truiden in Limburg.  Sint-Truiden plays in the Belgian Pro League.

Their best ranking was a second place in 1965–66. They also reached the final of the Belgian Cup twice. The club was founded in 1924. They are matricule number 373. The club colours are yellow and blue, hence their nickname De Kanaries, meaning 'The Canaries'. They have played their home games at the Stayen since 1927.

History

The club was created in 1924 following the merger between FC Union and FC Goldstar, two clubs from Sint-Truiden.  The colors of the club were chosen to be yellow and blue, to match the colors of the city, and it was named Sint-Truidense Voetbal Vereeniging.  The first game of the team, against Cercle Tongeren, was played in front of only 9 attendees. In the late 1930s, Léopold Appeltans was the leading player of Sint-Truidense. On 21 November 1948 he became the first capped player for Belgium while playing at this club. In the late 1940s it qualified for the second division. It also changed its name to Sint-Truidense Voetbalvereniging in 1947. Five years later it finished second in the second division and thus promoted to the first division. Successful manager Raymond Goethals arrived at Sint-Truiden in 1959. Under his management, the team finished second of the top division in 1966.

The former Sint-Truidense goalkeeper Jacky Mathijssen became the manager of the club in 2001 and remained at the helm for three seasons after which he left for Charleroi. He was replaced by Marc Wilmots, who was fired shortly after. The team finished the season under the coaching of the trio Guy Mangelschots, Eddy Raymaekers and Peter Voets. At the end of the 2004–05 season the board of directors hired Oostende manager Herman Vermeulen but he was dismissed on 9 February 2006 as the club pointed at the seventeenth position in the ranking. In 2008 the women's team of FCL Rapide Wezemaal joined STVV.

Honours
Belgian First Division:
Runners-up (1): 1965–66
Belgian Second Division:
Winners (4): 1986–87, 1993–94, 2008–09, 2014–15
Belgian Cup:
Runners-up (2): 1970–71, 2002–03
Belgian League Cup:
Winners (1): 1997–98

European record
As of 5 March 2006:

Current squad

Other players under contract

On loan

Coaching and medical staff
Manager: Bernd Hollerbach
Assistant manager: Davy Heymans
Physical coach: Stefan Winters
Team manager: Peter Delorge
Goalkeeping coach: Jurgen De Braekeleer
Team representative: Romain Proesmans
Kit men: Benny Liebens & Valere Stevens
Club Doctors: Pieter Bormans & Peter Bollars
Physiotherapists: Wouter Robijns & Par Vandenborne
Masseur: Roger Reniers

Managers

 Raymond Goethals (1959–66)
 Ward Volckaert (1966–69)
 Marcel Vercammen (1971–73)
 Gerard Bergholtz (1979–81)
 Wilfried Van Moer (1982–84)
 Eric Vanlessen (1984–85)
 Guy Mangelschots (1986–90)
 Walter Meeuws (1990–91)
 Odilon Polleunis (1991–92)
 Rudy Liebens &  Marek Dziuba (1992)
 Albert Van Marcke (1992)
 Martin Lippens (1992–93)
 Guy Mangelschots (1992–96)
 Wilfried Sleurs (1996)
 Freddy Smets (1996–97)
 Guy Mangelschots (1997)
 Barry Hulshoff (1997–98)
 Poll Peters (1998–99)
 Willy Reynders (1999–01)
 Jules Knaepen (2001)
 Jacky Mathijssen (2001–04)
 Marc Wilmots (2004–05)
 Herman Vermeulen (2005–06)
 Eddy Raeymaekers &  Peter Voets (2006)
 Thomas Caers (2006)
 Peter Voets (2006)
 Henk Houwaart (2006–07)
 Valère Billen (2007)
 Peter Voets (2007)
 Dennis Van Wijk (2007–08)
 Guido Brepoels (2008–11)
 Franky Van der Elst (2011–12)
 Guido Brepoels (2012–13)
 Yannick Ferrera (2013–15)
 Chris O'Loughlin (2015–16)
 Ivan Leko (2016–17)
 Tintín Márquez (2017)
 Jonas De Roeck (2017–18)
 Marc Brys (2018–19)
 Miloš Kostić (2020)
 Kevin Muscat (2020)
 Peter Maes (2020–21)
 Bernd Hollerbach (2021– )

References

External links

UEFA page

 
Association football clubs established in 1924
Football clubs in Belgium
1924 establishments in Belgium
Sport in Sint-Truiden
Belgian Pro League clubs